The Times of Malta is an English-language daily newspaper in Malta. Founded in 1935, by Lord and Lady Strickland and Lord Strickland's daughter Mabel, it is the oldest daily newspaper still in circulation in Malta. It has the widest circulation of any Maltese newspaper. The newspaper is published by Allied Newspapers Limited, which is owned by the Strickland Foundation, a charitable trust established by Mabel Strickland in 1979 to control the majority of the company.

History

The history of The Times of Malta is linked with that of its publishing house, Allied Newspapers Limited. This institution has a history going back to the 1920s, when it pioneered journalism and the printing industry in Malta.  It all started with the publication, by Gerald Strickland, of Malta's first evening newspaper in Maltese, Il-Progress. This was a four-page daily with its own printing offices in what was then 10A, Strada Reale, Valletta. The name "Progress" is retained to this day by the commercial sister of Allied Newspapers Limited, Progress Press Company Limited, formed in 1946.

Bilingual journalism, Maltese and English, was introduced in Malta with the publication, on 3 February 1922, of an English supplement to Il-Progress. The Times of Malta and Il-Progress lasted until 1 March 1929. The English supplement then became The Times of Malta Weekly (forerunner of The Sunday Times of Malta). The Maltese side was named Ix-Xemx, later changed to Id-Dehen and later still to Il-Berqa, first published on 29 January 1932. Il-Berqa ceased publication on 30 November 1968. In February 1931, Progress Press moved from Strada Reale to 341, St Paul Street, Valletta, until recently the site of Allied Newspapers Limited, also known as Strickland House.

As readership of the English supplement to Il-Progress soared, Lord Strickland was quick to see that there was room for an English daily. This would happen, so long as the new publication achieved and maintained a high standard of public service in information. The first issue of The Times of Malta was published in full co-operation with the British MI5 on 7 August 1935 under menacing war clouds as Italy planned the invasion of Abyssinia, which began in October of that year. On 2 September 1935, Mabel Strickland, who was a founder member of Allied Malta Newspapers Limited and formed part of the first Board of Directors, became the first editor of The Times of Malta. She also edited The Sunday Times of Malta from 1935 to 1950 when she was succeeded by the late George Sammut, who retired in 1966.  Anthony Montanaro was the next editor. He retired on 1 March 1991 and succeeded by Laurence Grech.

On 6 August 1960, the 25th anniversary of The Times of Malta, Strickland wrote that The Times of Malta, whilst originally the Constitutionalist political party's paper, had become a national newspaper. The paper won for itself a reputation for objective reporting whilst upholding its own strongly held editorial opinion. Strickland's editorship covered the difficult years of World War II. Nevertheless, none of the newspapers forming part of the Group ever missed an issue, in spite of continuous bombing and many shortages in the siege years between 1940 and 1943. The building was bombed twice, receiving a direct hit on 7 April 1942, when sixteen rooms were demolished but sparing the printing machines.

Thomas Hedley took over as editor from Strickland in 1950. He edited the paper through the traumatic years of political and industrial change, culminating in Malta's Independence in 1964. Under the editorship of Charles Grech Orr, The Times kept up the tradition of never missing an issue when twice hit by industrial action in 1973 and when political arsonists burned the building down on 15 October 1979. That date came to be known as "Black Monday". In the face of serious danger, the editor and his staff had to abandon the building. Printing of the following day's paper continued at another printing press, Independence Press. The paper was out on the street as usual the following morning, reduced in size but a triumph for freedom of expression. During the last 10 years, its website timesofmalta.com has become the primary news source in Malta and one of the main news websites in the Mediterranean. In June 2019, Herman Grech was appointed editor-in-chief, Bertrand Borg online editor and Mark Wood print editor.

In March 2021, Adrian Hillman, the former director of the Allied Group and Vince Buhagiar, the former chairman of Progress Press were charged in court with various fraud and money-laundering offences. It is alleged that Hillman and Buhagiar conspired with Keith Schembri, former Chief of Staff to Prime Minister Joseph Muscat, to defraud Progress Press of around €5.5 million by inflating the prices of machinery purchased from Schembri's company Kasco and sharing the profits between themselves.

References

External links
 

 
Newspapers published in Malta
Publications established in 1935
1935 establishments in Malta
Maltese news websites
English-language newspapers published in Europe